Robert Elopere (born on March 1, 1990) is an Indonesian footballer that currently plays for Persiwa Wamena in the Indonesia Super League.

References

External links
Robert Elopere at Liga Indonesia

1990 births
Living people
Association football defenders
Indonesian footballers
Liga 1 (Indonesia) players
Persiwa Wamena players
People from Wamena